Zeta Serpentis, Latinized from ζ Serpentis, is the Bayer designation for a single, yellow-white hued star in the equatorial constellation of Serpens. It is visible to the naked eye, having an apparent visual magnitude of 4.6. Based upon an annual parallax shift of 42.46 milliarcseconds as measured from the Hipparcos spacecraft, it is located 77 light years from the Sun. The star is moving closer to the Sun with a radial velocity of −50.7 km/s.

Around 2.4 billion years old, Zeta Serpentis has a stellar classification of F2 V indicating it is an ordinary F-type main-sequence star. This star has nearly double the radius of the Sun, 1.4 times the Sun's mass, and is radiating 6.3 times the Sun's luminosity from its outer atmosphere at an effective temperature of 6,529 K. It has a relatively high rate of spin, showing a projected rotational velocity of 69 km/s.

References

F-type main-sequence stars
Serpentis, Zeta
Serpens (constellation)
Durchmusterung objects
Serpentis, 57
164259
088175
6710